The men's rings was one of eight gymnastics events on the Gymnastics at the 1896 Summer Olympics programme. The fifth event, it was held on 9 April. There were eight competitors from three nations. The Greeks won the gold and bronze medals, with Hermann Weingärtner winning his fifth medal. Places 1–3 and 5 are known, but 4th place is not—any of the four athletes whose places are not known may have occupied the fourth position.

Background

This was the first appearance of the event, which is one of the five apparatus events held every time there were apparatus events at the Summer Olympics (no apparatus events were held in 1900, 1908, 1912, or 1920). The field consisted of 5 Germans, 2 Greeks, and possibly one Hungarian.

Competition format

Judges awarded the prizes, but little is known of the scoring and rankings. Each gymnast performed a routine two minutes long.

Schedule

The men's rings was held in the afternoon of the fourth day of events, following the 800 metres, team parallel bars, team horizontal bar, vault, and pommel horse.

Results

Three judges ranked Mitropoulos first while three other judges ranked Weingärtner first. Prince George broke the tie, in favor of Mitropoulos.

References

Sources
  (Digitally available at )
  (Excerpt available at )
 

Men's rings
Men's 1896